Briar Creek is a tributary of the Susquehanna River in Columbia County, Pennsylvania, in the United States. The stream has a watershed area of 33.0 square miles. It flows through Briar Creek Township and the borough of Briar Creek. The area near the creek was originally inhabited by the Lenni Lenape and the Shawanese. European settlers arrived in the 1770s.

Briar Creek has two named tributaries: West Branch Briar Creek and East Branch Briar Creek. The discharge of Briar Creek ranges from 0.06 to 50 cubic feet per second. The rock in the watershed mostly consists of sandstone, siltstone, mudstone, limestone, and shale.

There are Pennsylvania State Game Lands in the watershed, as well as a lake known as the Briar Creek Reservoir. In the lake, the most common species of fish is yellow perch.

Course
Briar Creek begins where Knob Mountain, Huntington Mountain, and Lee Mountain meet in western Briar Creek Township. It flows east for a short distance before turning south through a gap in Lee Mountain, briefly descending quite steeply. The course levels out as it leaves the mountain behind and begins flowing through a valley after a short distance. It flows under Pennsylvania Route 93, leaving the valley behind. Soon afterwards, the stream picks up the tributary West Branch Briar Creek and turns southeast. After some distance, it enters the community of Briar Creek and picks up the tributary East Branch Briar Creek. The stream then turns southwest and reaches its confluence with the Susquehanna River near French Island.

Tributaries

Briar Creek has two named tributaries: East Branch Briar Creek and West Branch Briar Creek.

Hydrology
The Briar Creek watershed falls into two of Pennsylvania's ten climate divisions: Division 1 (Pocono Mountains) and Division 5 (Central Susquehanna).

There is a median discharge of  cfs at this point. Near Briar Creek Reservoir, East Branch Briar Creek's discharge has a minimum of  cfs, a maximum of  cfs, and a median of  cfs.

This is the highest minimum temperature of any studied location in the watershed. This is the lowest minimum temperature of any studied location in the drainage basin.

Briar Creek is slightly alkaline on average.

Near Briar Creek's source, the median is  ppm, the minimum is 10 ppm, and the maximum is  ppm. The concentration of dissolved solids in the upper reaches of East Branch Briar Creek ranges from parts per  to  ppm, with a median of  ppm. Immediately upstream of Briar Creek Reservoir, the concentration ranges from parts per  to  ppm, with a median of  ppm.

Geology and geography
The watershed of Briar Creek is located in the ridge and valley physiographic region. The top of Lee Mountain forms a drainage divide between the creek's watershed and another watershed. Several points along Briar Creek and its tributaries have erode with ease or moderate ease. The infiltration capacity of these points is mostly moderate to high.

In the very northern reaches of the Briar Creek watershed, the bedrock is made up of sandstone. South of the sandstone layer, there is a section of the watershed where the bedrock is mudstone. In the central part of the watershed, the bedrock is siltstone. In the southern part of the watershed, the bedrock is mostly shale, including the part of the watershed in Berwick, which it has bedrock of calcerous shale. A small area north of Berwick has limestone bedrock.

There are a number of types of soil in the Briar Creek watershed. One of these is the Holly Series, which is an acidic silt loam. Another soil series in the drainage basin is the Buchanan Series, an acidic stony loam. Places it is found include Briar Creek about two miles downstream of its headwaters. The Albrights Series, a silt loam with gravel, is also found in the watershed, in such places as East Branch Briar Creek two miles downstream of its headwaters. The Chenango Series is a silt loam that occurs, among other places, in the southeastern and southern corners of the watershed. The Watson Series and the Middlebury Series (sandy and silty loams, respectively) are found in parts of the central part of the Briar Creek watershed. The Zipp Series is a somewhat acidic silt loam that occurs in places such as the Cabin Run watershed.

Watershed

It is located in Columbia County and Luzerne County. There are six communities that are fully or partly within the watershed: Briar Creek, Briar Creek Township, North Centre Township, Orange Township, and Berwick in Columbia County and Salem Township in Luzerne County. A total of 1.04 square miles are located in Briar Creek, 16.48 are located in Briar Creek Township, 12.04 are located in North Centre Township, 0.22 are located in Orange Township, 1.24 are in Berwick, and 1.94 are in Salem Township. As compared to other watersheds with the same size and land use, the Briar Creek watershed has been given a B rating by the Pennsylvania Department of Environmental Protection. According to the Briar Creek Coldwater Conservation Plan, this indicates that "residents in the watershed are working to improve and/or conserve resources in the area".

A total of 8678 acres, or 41% of the Briar Creek watershed is forested land. Much of this is on Knob Mountain or belongs to the Pennsylvania State Game Lands Number 55. A total of 7210 acres, or 34% of the watershed, is farmland and 1143 acres, or 6% of the watershed, is urban land. Most of this is in the southeastern part of the watershed. A total of 3984 acres, or 19% of the land in the watershed, is non-agricultural grassland.

The watershed is made up of seven smaller watersheds, or sub-watersheds. A 53-acre lake known as the Briar Creek Reservoir is also situated on a tributary to Briar Creek. The lake, which is manmade, was constructed for flood control purposes in the early 1970s. It is also used for fishing and boating.

History and etymology
Briar Creek was historically known as the "Kawanishoning" to the area's Native Americans. This name was a Lenni Lenape word for "sweet briar". However, the creek was also referred to as "Kawanishoning Creek" by white soldiers and explorers during the time of the American Revolutionary War. By 1770, some maps began referring to the creek as Bryar Creek, which became the more common name by the end of the eighteenth century and remained so as late as 1840. However, the spelling gradually changed to Brier Creek and then Briar Creek.

Up to approximately 1770, the area around Briar Creek was inhabited by the Lenni Lenape Indians. They built villages on the banks of the creek. The Shawanese also had a village at the mouth of the creek. In the 1770s, European settlers arrived in the area. The White family from New Jersey was among the first families of settlers to arrive in the Briar Creek valley. The Briar Creek area was one of the first places in Columbia County to be settled, on account of the high level of fertility of the land. The area around Briar Creek was part of Northumberland County in the late 1700s. In 1799, Samuel Ely was granted a patent from the state of Pennsylvania for 307 acres of land on Briar Creek known as "Manheim". In 1806, he gained a 426-acre tract of land on the creek. This tract was known as "Quincy". Ely's four sons inherited the land.

In the beginning of the 1800s, a number of mills were built on tributaries of the creek. A number of other industries were established in the watershed in the early 1800s, including a sawmill, a woolen mill, an iron furnace, and a tannery. In the second half of the 1800s, railroads began to be built in the watershed. Heavy industries and fisheries also began to appear in the area around this time.

By 1911, two dams had been constructed on Glen Brook (a subtributary of Briar Creek) in Briar Creek Township two miles north of Berwick. In 1911, the first dam, known as Number One, had a capacity of 15 million gallons. The second dam, known as Number Two, had a capacity of 7.5 million gallons. In 1911, a third dam was under construction several hundred feet downstream of the two aforementioned dams. It was intended to have a capacity of 23.8 million gallons.

The Briar Creek Watershed Association is a watershed association for Briar Creek. It was formed in 2006.

Biology
Pennsylvania State Game Lands#55 are in the Briar Creek watershed. The Pennsylvania Department of Conservation and Natural Resources has designated the Briar Creek watershed as "place of ecological importance".

More than 90 species of birds breed within the Briar Creek watershed. These include several species of ducks, flycatchers, herons, plovers, rails, and swallows, as well as one species of kingfisher and one species of crane. Bald eagles, sandhill cranes, and several species of waterfowl have been observed on Briar Creek Reservoir. Mammals living in the watershed include minks, muskrats, and short-tailed shrews, and the endangered Indiana bat. Fish, damselflies, mayflies, and other macroinvertebrates also inhabit the watershed. A total of 28 species of fish were observed by the Pennsylvania Fish and Boat Commission in the watershed in 2006. Earlier, 34 species were observed.

In April 2010, the Pennsylvania Fish and Boat Commission performed a survey of the fish species residing in Briar Creek Reservoir. The most common fish observed were yellow perch (645 specimens), brown bullhead (322 specimens), golden shiner (319 specimens), white crappie (216 specimens), hatchery trout (153 specimens), and bluegill (121 specimens). The smallest fish were pumpkinseed, of which 12 specimens between two and four inches (five and ten centimeters) were observed. Minnows also live in West Branch Briar Creek.

Recreation

Briar Creek Reservoir is located in the Briar Creek watershed, on East Branch Briar Creek. It is owned by the Pennsylvania Fish and Boat Commission and Columbia County. It was originally constructed to control floods, but most recreational activities in the watershed take place at this lake. These include fishing, picnicking, and weddings. There are also Pennsylvania State Game Lands in the watershed. The waters of Briar Creek are approved trout waters and the stream is stocked with trout.

See also
Tenmile Run, next tributary of the Susquehanna going downstream
Nescopeck Creek, next tributary of the Susquehanna going upstream
List of rivers of Pennsylvania

References

Rivers of Columbia County, Pennsylvania
Tributaries of the Susquehanna River
Rivers of Pennsylvania